Boyd River may refer to:
Boyd River (New South Wales) a tributary of Nymboida River in Australia 
Boyd River (Tasmania), a river of Australia
River Boyd, a river in South Gloucestershire, UK